Longshot or long shot may refer to:
 a contender (such as a racehorse) that appears to have little or no chance of winning
 Long shot, in photography and film, a shot that shows an entire object

Characters
 Longshot (Marvel Comics), a Marvel Comics superhero
Caine the Longshot, a character in the anime series Trigun
Longshot, member of "The Freedom Fighters" led by Jet, a character from the animated television series Avatar: The Last Airbender

Film
Long Shot (1939 film), an American film directed by Charles Lamont
Long Shot, a British film of 1978
Longshot (1981 film), a film starring Leif Garrett
The Longshot, a 1986 comedy film directed by Paul Bartel
Longshot (film), a 2000 film starring Hunter Tylo
The Long Shot, a 2004 Hallmark Channel film, starring Julie Benz
The Longshots, a 2008 film starring Ice Cube and Keke Palmer
Long Shot: The Kevin Laue Story, a 2013 documentary film by Franklin Martin
Long Shot (2017 film), a documentary directed by Jacob LaMendola
Long Shot (2019 film), a film starring Seth Rogen and Charlize Theron

Music
The Longshot (band), an American rock band
Long Shot, a 1969 album, or its 1968 title song, by the Pioneers
"Long Shot" (Aimee Mann song), 1996
"Long Shot" (Baillie & the Boys song), 1988
"Longshot" (Catfish and the Bottlemen song), 2019
"Long Shot" (Kelly Clarkson song), 2008
"Longshot", a song by Common Rider, 2001
"Longshot", a song by John Fogerty from Revival, 2007
"Longshot", a song by Waking Ashland from I Am for You, 2004
"Long shot", a song by Mayu Maeshima, opening music for Re:Zero − Starting Life in Another World, 2021

Other uses
Long Shot, an atomic weapons test, carried out on Amchitka island in 1965
Long Shot (TV series), a 1959 Canadian current affairs television series
Long Shot (Niven), a spacecraft from Larry Niven's Ringworld series
"Long Shot" (The Professionals), an episode of the television series
Project Longshot, a design for an interstellar spacecraft
"Long Shot", a short story by Vernor Vinge
Long Shot, a memoir about former Major League Baseball player Mike Piazza
Longshot CS-6, a 2006 Nerf blaster released under the N-Strike|N-Strike series
Longshot CS-12, a 2014 Nerf blaster released under the Z.E.D Squad sub-series of the Zombie Strike series
a variation of the Hookshot in the Legend of Zelda series
Longshot, the name of a single-player game mode in Madden NFL 18